Ren Rong (10 September 1917 – 16 June 2017) was a Chinese general and politician. 

A native of Cangxi County, he joined the Communist Youth League of China in 1933 and became a formal member of the Chinese Communist Party the next year. Ren fought in the Second Sino–Japanese War, the Chinese Civil War and the Korean War. From 1971 to 1980, he was the Communist Party Chief of the Tibet Autonomous Region. Ren died in Wuhan, aged 99, in 2017.

References

1917 births
2017 deaths
People's Liberation Army generals from Sichuan
Eighth Route Army personnel
Academic staff of the Counter-Japanese Military and Political University